Bhazon Kara is a village in Alkara Union of Chauddagram Upazila, which is in the Comilla District of eastern Bangladesh.

Communication is pretty good due to beside of Dhaka-Chittagong highway. The village has a primary school, community clinics, including mosque, madrasas and tourist attractions.

References

Villages in Comilla District
Populated places in Cumilla District
Villages in Chittagong Division